The Surinamese passport is issued to citizens of Suriname for international travel. The passport is a Caricom passport as Suriname is a member of the Caribbean Community.

As of 1 January 2017, Surinamese citizens had visa-free or visa on arrival access to 74 countries and territories, ranking the Surinamese passport 65th in terms of travel freedom (tied with Botswana passport) according to the Henley visa restrictions index.

Caribbean
 Visa policy toward Surinamese in the region
 British
 Dutch
 French

See also
 Visa requirements for Surinamese citizens
 Visa policy of Suriname

References

Passports by country
Government of Suriname